Euglena viridis is a freshwater, single cell, mixotroph microalgae bearing a secondary chloroplast. Their chloroplast is bounded by three layers of membrane without a nucleomorph.  Normally, it is 40–65 μm long, slightly bigger than other well-known Euglena species: Euglena gracilis.

Taxonomy 
The whole group of Euglenozoa was originally placed in a group called Excavata. However, Excavata has been thought not monophyletic and is divided into several groups. Now, Euglenozoa is placed below a group in Discoba.

Euglena viridis is one of the first Euglena species when Ehrenberg established the genus Euglena. Euglena viridis is also the type species of this genus.

Morphology 
Morphologically, Euglena viridis can be distinguished from other Euglena species by its one axial, stellate chloroplast with a paramylon center in it. But there are still five species sharing these morphological features.

Molecular evidence 
The phylogenetic trees of the Euglena genus still have some clades with polytomy. The phylogenetic relationship of Euglena viridis with other Euglena species is still unclear until 2017.

Accessibility 
Euglena viridis is common and cosmopolitan in bodies of water rich in organic compounds. It can also be bought through some institutions and can be maintained by replenishing it with fresh tap water and fresh leaf blades once a week. Such accessibility lets it easily be used. For example, a research tests new cultivating system by cultivating Euglena viridis. And Euglena viridis is also used as teaching material in biology class in order to demonstrate important biology concepts such as phylogenetic relationship and growth of population.

Pollution tolerance and biodegradation 
In a wastewater biodegradation system, algae can provide the oxygen that heterotrophic bacteria need for the degradation of organic matter. Euglena is considered to be the most pollution tolerance genus among all algae genus. The ability to live in polluted water bodies have let Euglena viridis be used as an oxygen producer in wastewater biodegrading system. And it has been proven that Euglena viridis can enhance biodegradation in piggery wastewater degradation system.

References 

Euglenozoa
Taxa named by Christian Gottfried Ehrenberg